The 2012 Swiss Figure Skating Championships took place between 8 and 10 December 2011 at the ST.JAKOB.ARENA in Basel. Skaters competed in the disciplines of men's singles, ladies' singles, pair skating, and ice dancing on the senior level. The results were used to choose the Swiss teams to the 2012 World Championships and the 2012 European Championships.

Results

Men

Ladies

Pairs

Ice dance

External links
 2012 Swiss Championships results

Swiss Figure Skating Championships
2011 in figure skating
Swiss Figure Skating Championships, 2012